Krnica is a settlement in the Municipality of Gorje in the Upper Carniola region of Slovenia.

Geography
The Pokljuka Gorge begins at Krnica.

History
Krnica included the hamlet of Zatrnik until 2020, when it became a separate settlement.

Notable people
Notable people that were born or lived in Krnica include:
 Tone Polda (1917–1945), writer and poet

References

External links

Krnica on Geopedia

Populated places in the Municipality of Gorje